In the geometry of hyperbolic 3-space, the order-4-5 pentagonal honeycomb a regular space-filling tessellation (or honeycomb) with Schläfli symbol {5,4,5}.

Geometry
All vertices are ultra-ideal (existing beyond the ideal boundary) with five order-4 pentagonal tilings existing around each edge and with an order-5 square tiling vertex figure.

Related polytopes and honeycombs 
It a part of a sequence of regular polychora and honeycombs {p,4,p}:

Order-4-6 hexagonal honeycomb

In the geometry of hyperbolic 3-space, the order-4-6 hexagonal honeycomb is a regular space-filling tessellation (or honeycomb) with Schläfli symbol {6,3,6}. It has six order-4 hexagonal tilings, {6,4}, around each edge. All vertices are ultra-ideal (existing beyond the ideal boundary) with infinitely many hexagonal tilings existing around each vertex in an order-6 square tiling vertex arrangement.

It has a second construction as a uniform honeycomb, Schläfli symbol {6,(4,3,4)}, Coxeter diagram, with alternating types or colors of cells. In Coxeter notation the half symmetry is [6,4,6,1+] = [6,((4,3,4))].

Order-4-infinite apeirogonal honeycomb 

In the geometry of hyperbolic 3-space, the order-4-infinite apeirogonal honeycomb is a regular space-filling tessellation (or honeycomb) with Schläfli symbol {∞,4,∞}. It has infinitely many order-4 apeirogonal tiling {∞,4} around each edge. All vertices are ultra-ideal (existing beyond the ideal boundary) with infinitely many hexagonal tilings existing around each vertex in an infinite-order square tiling vertex arrangement.

It has a second construction as a uniform honeycomb, Schläfli symbol {∞,(4,∞,4)}, Coxeter diagram, with alternating types or colors of cells.

See also 
 Convex uniform honeycombs in hyperbolic space
 List of regular polytopes
 Infinite-order dodecahedral honeycomb

References 

Coxeter, Regular Polytopes, 3rd. ed., Dover Publications, 1973. . (Tables I and II: Regular polytopes and honeycombs, pp. 294–296)
 The Beauty of Geometry: Twelve Essays (1999), Dover Publications,  (Chapter 10, Regular Honeycombs in Hyperbolic Space) Table III
 Jeffrey R. Weeks The Shape of Space, 2nd edition  (Chapters 16–17: Geometries on Three-manifolds I,II)
 George Maxwell, Sphere Packings and Hyperbolic Reflection Groups, JOURNAL OF ALGEBRA 79,78-97 (1982) 
 Hao Chen, Jean-Philippe Labbé, Lorentzian Coxeter groups and Boyd-Maxwell ball packings, (2013)
 Visualizing Hyperbolic Honeycombs arXiv:1511.02851 Roice Nelson, Henry Segerman (2015)

External links 
John Baez, Visual insights: {5,4,3} Honeycomb (2014/08/01) {5,4,3} Honeycomb Meets Plane at Infinity (2014/08/14) 
 Danny Calegari, Kleinian, a tool for visualizing Kleinian groups, Geometry and the Imagination 4 March 2014. 

Honeycombs (geometry)
Pentagonal tilings
Infinite-order tilings
Isogonal 3-honeycombs
Isochoric 3-honeycombs
Order-4-n 3-honeycombs
Order-n-5 3-honeycombs
Regular 3-honeycombs